Cheremkhovo is a rural locality (a selo) and the administrative center of Cheremkhovsky Selsoviet of Ivanovsky District, Amur Oblast, Russia. The population was 824 as of 2018. There are 8 streets.

Geography 
Bogorodskoye is the nearest rural locality.

References 

Rural localities in Ivanovsky District, Amur Oblast